Tiexi District is one of ten districts of the prefecture-level city of Shenyang, the capital of Liaoning Province, Northeast China, and forms part of the urban core. It borders Yuhong District to the north, Huanggu District to the northeast, Heping District to the east, Sujiatun District to the southeast, Liaozhong County to the southwest, and Xinmin City to the northwest; it also borders the prefecture-level city of Liaoyang to the south.

Administrative divisions
There are 20 subdistricts within the district.

Subdistricts:
Lingkong Subdistrict, Qinggong Subdistrict, Weigong Subdistrict, Qi Lu Subdistrict, Shi'er Road Subdistrict, Luguan Subdistrict, Qixian Subdistrict, Xinggong Subdistrict, Qigong Subdistrict, Jihong Subdistrict, Chonggong Subdistrict, Xinghua Subdistrict, Gongrencun Subdistrict, Guihe Subdistrict, Xingshun Subdistrict, Yanfen Subdistrict, Dugong Subdistrict, Xingqi Subdistrict, Baogong Subdistrict, Yunfeng Subdistrict

References

County-level divisions of Liaoning
Shenyang